Tetrisia is an invalid genus name for a species of moths in the family Erebidae, containing a single species, T. florigera. It was described by Francis Walker in 1867. It is found in South America, including Costa Rica, Brazil and Colombia.

Taxonomy
The genus name is a homonym of Tetrisia Walker, 1867, a genus of plataspid bugs, published four months earlier, so the moth name must be formally replaced.

The species Dysschema tricolora (Sulzer, 1776) has been mistakenly listed in the literature under the genus Tetrisia.

References

Calpinae
Monotypic moth genera
Moths described in 1867
Taxa named by Francis Walker (entomologist)